Hoodoo Butte is a cinder cone butte in the Cascade Range of northern Oregon, located near Santiam Pass. Immediately to the east lies Hayrick Butte, a prime example of a tuya; the two mountains' names were likely mistaken for each other, but stuck with them over time. The area has been subjected to a number of historic fires. This region has a high vent density, with many mafic (rich in magnesium and iron) volcanoes of Pleistocene to Holocene age, such as Hoodoo. While Hoodoo has an intact summit crater that was blocked from erosion by glaciers, it has an irregular topography, giving it an open appearance.

A ski area, also named Hoodoo, is located on the northwest through northeast flanks of the cone, and includes five chairlifts. Other recreational activities popular in the area include snowshoeing and snowmobiling during the winter, and fishing, hiking, camping, mountain biking, windsurfing, and water skiing popular during the summer season.

Geography 
Hoodoo Butte lies in Linn County, in the northern part of the U.S. state of Oregon.

Physical geography 

In 1967, a stand replacement fire (a fire that kills most if not all of the living upper canopy layer in the forest and initiates succession or regrowth) burned through  of the surrounding Santiam Pass area. It reached the vegetation on the eastern and southern flanks of Hoodoo Butte, leaving patches of trees compared to the denser forest on the northern slope. Forest fires tore through the region again during the summer of 2003.

Soil on the mountain ranges from shallow to moderately deep with loam, and tends to be loose and cindery.

Ecology 
Bird species near Hoodoo include woodpeckers and bald eagles. Deer and American black bears frequent the surrounding area.

Geology 
Hoodoo Butte lies near the Santiam Pass area, in the eastern segment of the Cascade Range known as the High Cascades, which trends north–south. Constructed towards the end of the Pleistocene epoch, these mountains are underlain by more ancient volcanoes that subsided due to parallel north–south faulting in the surrounding region. In the region stretching south from Mount Jefferson to Santiam Pass, shield volcanoes dominate, forming a broad ridge with cinder cones. Eruptions at these vents have produced rocks with compositions ranging from basaltic andesite to andesite and basalt lavas. The majority of rock in the region consists of normally polarized material less than 730,000 years old.

With at least 466 volcanoes active during the Quaternary, it has a high vent density, with many mafic (rich in magnesium and iron) volcanoes of Pleistocene to Holocene age. Hoodoo Butte is one of the larger mafic volcanoes, along with Three Fingered Jack, North Sister, and the vents of the Mount Bachelor chain.

Sometimes considered a subfeature of the Mount Washington shield volcano, Hoodoo forms one of several glaciated remnants of Pleistocene volcanoes in the region, other nearby examples including Maxwell Butte and Cache Mountain. It is a cinder cone and possesses an intact summit crater, since the neighboring andesite lava dome of Hayrick Butte prevented Pleistocene glaciers from reaching Hoodoo's summit. The crater is open to the east as a result of its irregular topography, which led to uneven distribution of ejected material such that most of the volcanic rock that forms the edifice was deposited elsewhere. The cinder cone is surrounded by volcanic ash from the Sand Mountain Cones that was moved by water, and some of this ash forms a layer on the floor of the summit crater.

Human history 

According to one local story, a cartographer accidentally switched the names for Hoodoo Butte and the nearby tuya Hayrick Butte. The word "hoodoo" refers to rock buttresses like those observed at the nearby Hayrick Butte, while "hayrick" is a synonym for haystack, a more fitting name for Hoodoo Butte, which has a profile that resembles a haystack shape. Whether or not this error actually occurred remains unclear, but the names remain to present day.

The top of Hoodoo Butte has electronic communication relay sites, which are owned by AT&T and Bend Telecommunications.

Recreation 

The Hoodoo ski area, a popular winter sports destination, sits on Hoodoo Butte. It encompasses  with 34 trail runs, five chairlifts, a snow tubing park, night skiing, lodges, rental and repair stores, and a day-care building. First built in 1938, the original ski area was supported by a group funded by Ed Thurston of Eugene. Following World War II, the ski area embarked on improvements, including lodging and chairlifts. The oldest ski area in the Central Cascades, the Hoodoo area offers terrains for all levels of skiing. It closes to off-road motorized vehicle use from November 1 through May 15.

In addition to skiing, snowshoeing and snowmobiling are popular winter activities in the area, with fishing, hiking, camping, and mountain biking popular during the summer season. The Hoodoo Ski Bowl offers scenic views of the local region. Recreational boating, windsurfing, and water skiing are also common during the summer.

See also 

 Santiam Highway
 Hogg Rock

Notes 

References

Sources 

 
 
 
 
 
 
 

Buttes of Oregon
Cascade Range
Cascade Volcanoes
Cinder cones of the United States
Mountains of Oregon
Subduction volcanoes
Volcanoes of Linn County, Oregon
Volcanoes of Oregon